(b. Oct. 24, 1902 - d. Aug. 28, 1996) was a Japanese diplomat.

Served as Japanese Consul in Hong Kong in May–June 1941. In November 1951, arrived at Taiwan as Chief of the Japanese Government Overseas Office, as diplomatic relations were not established yet. In 1952, took part in peace negotiations with the government of Taiwan. Upon the reestablishment of Japanese Embassy in Taipei, he served as Counselor of the embassy from 1952 to 1953. In 1957, upon the reestablishment of diplomatic relations between the governments of Japan and Czechoslovakia, was appointed Japanese Ambassador to that country, and served in that position until 1961. In 1961 represented Japan at the World Meteorological Organization. In 1966 became the first Japanese Ambassador to South Korea, and served in that position until 1968.

See also
 List of ambassadors of Japan to Czechoslovakia and the Czech Republic

References

Ambassadors of Japan to Czechoslovakia
Ambassadors of Japan to South Korea
1902 births
1996 deaths
Japanese expatriates in Hong Kong